Port of Meeruse (port code EE MRS) is a seaport situated on the southwestern coast of Kopli, Tallinn, Estonia, located in eastern area of Kopli Bay.

See also

Transport in Estonia

References

External links

Meeruse
Transport in Tallinn